Baraklı can refer to:

 Baraklı, Evciler
 Baraklı, Keles